Eline Eriksen (1881 – 1963), born Eline Vilhelmine Møller, was the wife (since 1900) of Edvard Eriksen and the model for the body of the Little Mermaid statue in Copenhagen, Denmark. The face of that statue was modeled after ballerina Ellen Price. Before this Eriksen had stood model for several of her husband's statues, such as The First Grief and The Sufferer. She is buried along with her husband at Copenhagen's Vestre Cemetery.

Notes

Danish female models
Danish artists' models
1881 births
1963 deaths